The China Financial Futures Exchange (CFFEX), is a futures exchange established in Shanghai on September 8, 2006—with the approval of the State Council and the authorization of China Securities Regulatory Commission (CSRC). It is a joint venture of the Zhengzhou Commodity Exchange, Shenzhen Stock Exchange and the Shanghai Futures Exchange.

Following the principle of higher starting point and higher standard, CFFEX constructed an electronic market which follows the trend of global development. Also CFFEX has a unique multi-tiered members' clearing system, strict risk management policy and an organization structure like a corporation to improve its competitive strength and development potential.

In early 2008, it launched the CSI 300 index futures, the first contract of CFFEX. Later, CFFEX introduced government bond futures and futures on the SSE 50 Index and the CSI 500 Index. The exchange has plans for other financial derivatives such as other index futures, index options, and currency futures. CFFEX launched its first product  by conducting trading systems testing and running a series of programs to educate investors about risks.

References

External links
China Financial Futures Exchange - Official Website

Financial services companies established in 2006
Commodity exchanges in China
Futures exchanges
Chinese companies established in 2006